This is the list of cathedrals in Taiwan sorted by denomination.

Roman Catholic
Cathedrals of the Roman Catholic Church:
 Cathedral of Our Lady of the Sacred Heart in Hsinchu City
 Mary Help of Christians Cathedral in Hualien City
 Cathedral of Our Lady of the Temple Rose in Kaohsiung
 Cathedral of St. John in Chiayi City
 Cathedral of Christ the Saviour in Taichung
 Cathedral of Our Lady of China in Tainan
 Cathedral of the Immaculate Conception in Taipei

Anglican
Cathedrals of the Episcopal Church:
 St. John's Cathedral in Taipei

See also

List of cathedrals
Christianity in Taiwan

References

 
Taiwan
Cathedrals
Cathedrals